In New Zealand and Australia, an area school is a school that takes children from kindergarten age (usually 4 or 5 years old) all the way through to tertiary entrance exams (at about age 18). They tend to be built in small towns where the cost of separate primary and secondary schools cannot be justified. These schools distinguish between primary and secondary stages internally but there is a single headteacher, faculty and administration.

References

Schools in Australia
Education in New Zealand
School types